A coffee enema is the injection of coffee into the rectum and colon via the anus, i.e., as an enema. There is no scientific evidence to support any positive health claim for this practice, and medical authorities advise that the procedure may be dangerous.

Efficacy and safety 
There is no medical or scientific evidence to support any detoxification or anti-cancer effect of coffee enemas.

Coffee enemas carry a risk of adverse effects, some of them serious, including infection, seizures, heart and lung problems, and death.

History 

The rationale for using enemas can be traced back the earliest medical texts, to the prescientific misconception that the accumulation of faeces in the intestines can lead to autointoxication and that the "cleansing" of intestines can prevent that.

The practice of colon cleansing experienced a renaissance in the 1990s, and at this time, coffee enemas were used as alternative cancer treatments. Their frequent use is a feature of Gerson therapy and Kelley therapy, ineffective alternative cancer therapies. Their use is promoted with claims they can "detoxify" the body by boosting the function of the gallbladder and liver. Such claims are not supported by evidence. In 2018, Gwyneth Paltrow's company goop.com was promoting coffee enema kits, one of a number of questionable medical products it has sold.

Advocates of coffee enemas often point to their inclusion in editions of the Merck Manual through 1972, where coffee is listed as an ingredient for a retention enema for treating constipation. The Merck Manual does not list any other uses for coffee enemas, and in editions after 1972 all mention of them was dropped.

See also 
List of unproven and disproven cancer treatments
Naturopathy

References 

Alternative detoxification
Alternative cancer treatments
Coffee